Norman Magnus MacLeod of MacLeod (27 July 1839 – 5 November 1929) was the 26th Chief of Clan MacLeod.

Biography
Norman Magnus MacLeod of MacLeod was born on 27 July 1839. He was the eldest son of Norman MacLeod of MacLeod (1812–1898), 25th Chief of Clan MacLeod and his wife Louisa Barbara St John (1818–1880), only daughter of the 14th Baron St John of Bletso.

He was educated at Harrow and in 1858, at the age of 19, was commissioned into the 74th Highlanders, immediately joining the regiment in India. He served as aide de camp to General Sir Hope Grant, Commander in Chief in the Presidency of Madras from 1862 to 1865. He retired from the 74th Highlanders as a Captain in 1872. In 1878, Norman was appointed as political agent on the Transvaal border at the outbreak of the Zulu War. In 1879, he commanded a Swazi army of 8,000 attached with an undetermined number of British officers and NCOs, against the Pedis. The Swazi army decisively defeated the Pedis at the Battle of Wulu.

Norman returned home in 1880 and succeeded his late father as the 26th Chief of MacLeod in 1885. The MacLeod #4 tartan, commonly known as Macleod hunting tartan, was approved by Norman in 1910.

Norman married Emily Caroline, daughter of Sir Charles Isham, 10th Baronet, in 1881. They had two daughters, Margaret Louisa and Emily Pauline. He died on 5 November 1929.

Succession of the chiefship after his death
As Norman had no sons, he was succeeded as clan chief by his younger brother, Sir Reginald, the 27th Chief of MacLeod. Sir Reginald also had no sons and a further brother's only son had been killed in action in 1915. As there were, therefore, no immediate male heirs, Sir Reginald was succeeded by his eldest daughter, Dame Flora MacLeod of MacLeod (1878–1976), 28th Chief of MacLeod and the first female chief of the clan.

Ancestry

References

1839 births
1929 deaths
Norman
74th Highlanders officers
People educated at Harrow School
MacLeod, Norman Magnus MacLeod, 5th Lord